Anthony Gregory Carr (born October 11, 1997) is an American professional basketball player for Hapoel Gilboa Galil in the Israeli Basketball Premier League. He played college basketball for the Penn State Nittany Lions.

Early years
Carr was born Anthony Gregory Andre Carr in Philadelphia, Pennsylvania. He attended Roman Catholic High School where helped lead the Cahillites to back-to-back PIAA AAAA-level state championships, along with teammates Nazeer Bostick and Lamar Stevens, who also signed with Penn State's Class of 2016. 

After strong junior and senior years, Carr was Named the 2016 Pennsylvania Player of the Year by USA Today and by the Pennsylvania Sports Writers in 2015 and 2016. He earned First Team All-Pennsylvania (PA Sports Writers) honors and All-Philadelphia accolades by the Philadelphia Daily News each of the last two years and also was ranked No. 50 in 2016 ESPN Top 100 recruits.

Recruiting

Awards and Honors
 2× All-Philadelphia Area (2015, 2016)
 Pennsylvania Player of the Year by USA Today (2016)
 2× PA Sports Writers Player of the Year (2015, 2016)
 2× First Team All-Pennsylvania (2016, 2016)
 First Team All-Pennsylvania by PennLive.com (2016)
 2× Pennsylvania State Champion (2015, 2016)

College career

Freshman season
Carr signed with the Nittany Lions on August 13, 2016. Carr, along with teammates Lamar Stevens and Nazeer Bostick, would join guard Shep Garner, who was a junior with the Nittany Lions.

In his freshman season, Carr averaged 13.2 points per game, leading the Nittany Lions in scoring. 

He recorded his best shooting performance of the season on January 18, tallying 24 points in a 78–75 loss to the Indiana Hoosiers. Carr started all 33 games. He was named to the Big Ten All-Freshman team.

Sophomore season
Carr opened the season with a 33 point performance in an 86–75 win over Campbell. It was the first of four 30-point performances in the 2017–2018 season.  

Carr scored 28 points and went 10–14 from the field in an 82–79 upset over No. 13 Ohio State. Carr hit the game-winning shot as time expired to give Penn State their first win that season over an AP Top 25 opponent. The Nittany Lions would beat the Buckeyes twice more, including a 69–68 upset win in the quarterfinals of the Big Ten tournament.

Penn State earned a berth in the National Invitation Tournament for the first time since 2009, when they claimed their first title. Penn State opened with a 63–57 win over Temple, a game in which Carr had his worst shooting performance of the season, scoring just two points on 12 shots. The Nittany Lions then cruised to another NIT championship with wins over Notre Dame, Marquette, Mississippi State and Utah. Carr averaged 17.4 points per game in the tournament with strong performances in the team's final four games. Carr recorded a double-double (15 points, 14 assists) in the NIT championship game.

After the season, Carr declared for the 2018 NBA draft. On June 21, 2018, Carr was selected by the New Orleans Pelicans with the 51st pick in the draft.

College statistics

|-
| style="text-align:left;"| 2016–17
| style="text-align:left;"| Penn State
| 33 || 33 || 32.8 || .377 || .320 || .779 || 4.8 || 4.2 || .7 || .3 || 13.2
|-
| style="text-align:left;"| 2017–18
| style="text-align:left;"| Penn State
| 37 || 37 || 35.4 || .408 || .433 || .799 || 4.9 || 5.0 || .8 || .3 || 19.6
|-
! colspan=2|  !! 70 !! 70 !! 34.2 !! .396 !! .395 !! .786 !! 4.9 !! 4.6 !! .7 !! .3 !! 16.6
|}

Professional career

Europe (2018–2020)
On July 20, 2018, Carr signed a deal with the Italian club Auxilium Torino.

On February 26, 2019, Carr left Auxilium Torino and signed with fellow Italian team Pallacanestro Cantù.

On August 10, 2019, Parma Basket of the VTB United League announced they had signed Carr.

Erie BayHawks (2020–2021)
On January 3, 2020, Carr returned to the United States and signed with the Pelicans' G League affiliate Erie BayHawks. On March 6, Carr contributed 12 points, 10 assists, four rebounds, four steals and one block in a win against the Greensboro Swarm. He averaged 8.5 points and 2.9 rebounds per game.

On December 5, 2020, Carr signed with the New Orleans Pelicans, but was later waived by the New Orleans Pelicans at the end of training camp, on December 19. On January 21, 2021, he returned to Erie.

Saskatchewan Rattlers (2022)
On May 6, 2022, Carr signed with the Saskatchewan Rattlers of the CEBL. He averaged 19.8 points (5th in the CEBL), 6.5 rebounds (10th), 6.6 assists (2nd), and 0.9 steals per game in 19 games.

Bakken Bears (2022–2023)
On August 5, 2022, he signed with Bakken Bears of the Danish Basketligaen. Carr left the team in January 2023.

Hapoel Gilboa Galil (2023–present)
In January 2023 Carr joined Hapoel Gilboa Galil in the Israeli Basketball Premier League.

Personal life
Carr is the son of Anthony and Nicole Carr. He also has two brothers, Derek Carr and Khalief Tinley, and one sister, Ciara Robinson. He majored in recreation, park, & tourism management at Penn State.

References

1997 births
Living people
American expatriate basketball people in Canada
American expatriate basketball people in Italy
American men's basketball players
Auxilium Pallacanestro Torino players
Basketball players from Philadelphia
Erie BayHawks (2019–2021) players
Hapoel Gilboa Galil Elyon players
Lega Basket Serie A players
New Orleans Pelicans draft picks
Pallacanestro Cantù players
Penn State Nittany Lions basketball players
Point guards
Saskatchewan Rattlers players
Shooting guards